Married Women's Property Act may refer to one of the following laws:

United Kingdom:
Married Women's Property Act 1870
Married Women's Property Act 1882
Married Women's Property Act 1884
Married Women's Property Act 1893

United States:
Married Women's Property Acts in the United States